Carsten Wehlmann (born 27 June 1972) is a German former professional footballer who played as a goalkeeper.

Career
Wehlmann joined 2. Bundesliga club FC St Pauli from Regionalliga Nord side VfL 93 Hamburg in November 1995. At FC St. Pauli, he started out as third-choice keeper behind Klaus Thomforde and .

References

Living people
1972 births
German footballers
Association football goalkeepers
2. Bundesliga players
VfL 93 Hamburg players
FC St. Pauli players
Hamburger SV II players
Hannover 96 players
VfB Lübeck players